Industry is 39.4% of China's gross domestic product (GDP) in 2022. In 2007, industry (including mining, manufacturing, construction, and power) contributed 46.7 percent of GDP in 2010 and occupied 27 percent of the workforce. In 2015, the manufacturing industrial sectors contributed to 40% of China's GDP. The manufacturing sector produced 44.1 percent of GDP in 2004 and accounted for 11.3 percent of total employment in 2006.

China is the world's leading manufacturer of chemical fertilizers, cement, and steel. Prior to 1978, most output was produced by state-owned enterprises. As a result of the economic reforms that followed, there was a significant increase in production by enterprises sponsored by local governments, especially townships and villages, and, increasingly, by private entrepreneurs and foreign investors, but by 1990 the state sector accounted for about 70 percent of output. By 2002 the share in gross industrial output by state-owned and state-holding industries had decreased with the state-run enterprises themselves accounting for 46 percent of China's industrial output. In November, 2012 the State Council of the People's Republic of China mandated a "social risk assessment" for all major industrial projects. This requirement followed mass public protests in some locations for planned projects or expansions.

History

Industry and construction account for about 48% of China's GDP. China ranks first worldwide in industrial output. Major industries include mining and ore processing; iron and steel; aluminium; coal; machinery; armaments; textiles and apparel; petroleum; cement; chemical; fertilizers; food processing; automobiles and other transportation equipment including rail cars and locomotives, ships, and aircraft; consumer products including footwear, toys, and electronics; telecommunications and information technology. China has become a preferred destination for the relocation of global manufacturing facilities. Its strength as an export platform has contributed to incomes and employment in China. The state-owned sector still accounts for about 40% of GDP. In recent years, authorities have been giving greater attention to the management of state assets—both in the financial market as well as among state-owned-enterprises—and progress has been noteworthy.

Since the founding of the People's Republic, industrial development has been given considerable attention. Among the various industrial branches the machine-building and metallurgical industries have received the highest priority. These two areas now account for about 20–30 percent of the total gross value of industrial output. In these, as in most other areas of industry, however, innovation has generally suffered at the hands of a system that has rewarded increases in gross output rather than improvements in variety, sophistication and quality. China, therefore, still imports significant quantities of specialized steels. Overall industrial output has grown at an average rate of more than 10 percent per year, having surpassed all other sectors in economic growth and degree of modernization. Industrial output growth 1978–2006 Some heavy industries and products deemed to be of national strategic importance remain state-owned, but an increasing proportion of lighter and consumer-oriented manufacturing firms are privately held or are private-state joint ventures.

Structure
Since the 1950s, the trend away from the agricultural sector toward industrialisation has been dramatic, and is a result of both policy changes and free market mechanisms. During the 1950s and 1960s, heavy industry received most attention and consequently grew twice as rapidly as agriculture. After the reforms of 1978, more attention to the agricultural sector as well as a move away from heavy industry toward light resulted in agricultural output almost doubling with only marginal increases for industry.

Before 1978, state-owned and collectively owned enterprises represented 77.6 percent and 22.4 percent respectively of China's exclusively public-ownership economy. The policy of reform and opening-up has given extensive scope to the common development of various economic sectors. Individual and private industrial enterprises and enterprises have mushroomed with investment from outside mainland China.

Domestically, modernisation and economic growth has been the focus of the reformist policies introduced by Deng Xiaoping, and in attempting to achieve this, the leadership has implemented the Four Modernizations Program that lays special emphasis on the fields of agriculture, industry

In the countryside, the "responsibility system" has been implemented and basically represents a return to family farming. Under this system, families lease land for a period of up to thirty years, and must agree to supply the state an agreed quota of grain or industrial crops at a fixed low cost in return. The remaining surplus can either be sold to the state or on the free market. As a result, peasants have been increasing their agricultural output in response to these incentives.

Together with the responsibility system, there have also been a number of reforms relating to rural businesses—especially in the spheres of commerce and manufacturing. The increase in personal income brought about through the responsibility system has led to a burgeoning of small-scale enterprises that remain completely in private hands.

Reform of state-owned enterprises has always been the key link of China's economic restructuring. The Chinese government has made various attempts to solve the problem of chronic extensive losses in this sector and by now almost every state-owned enterprise has adopted the company system. After being transformed into joint stock companies, the economic benefit of the state-owned enterprises increased steadily and their overall strength and quality were remarkably enhanced, gaining continuously in their control, influence and lead in the whole national economy.

The role of free market forces has also been instrumental in altering China's sectoral make-up. After 1979, the forces of supply and demand meant that consumers could play a greater role in determining which crops would be planted. This had the effect of making more profitable the planting of such crops as fruit, vegetables and tea. As a consequence, however, traditional grain crops have suffered, as farmers prefer to plant the more profitable cash crops.

Increases in light industrial production and more profitable crops brought about by the loosening of market controls had not always been enough to satisfy consumer demand, which in turn led to inflation. Rather than increased demand being met with increased supply, the manufacturing sector and economic infrastructure were still too underdeveloped to supply a population of over one billion people with the commodities they wanted or needed. Instead, a 'dual track' pricing system arose which had promoted arbitrage between official and free-market prices for the same commodities.

Inflation and the unavailability of consumer goods had made some commodities too expensive for ordinary Chinese workers, as well as resulting in a general decline in living standards. Another factor arising from inflation in China had been corruption among the higher echelons of the CCP. Managers of factories in regulated industries—usually high-level Party cadres—have been selling factory produce on the free market at grossly inflated prices. Inflation and corruption had become so embedded in the system by 1988, that the leadership was forced to take some drastic economic measures.

In response to the general economic malaise, Prime Minister Li Peng adopted several austerity measures in the middle of 1988. The primary goal of these measures was to reduce economic growth and included such measures as limiting joint ventures, curtailing capital investment, tightening fiscal and monetary controls, reimposing centralised control on local construction projects and cuts in capital investment.

China's eighth Five Year Plan (1991–1995) reflected the goals of slowing the economy down to a manageable level after the excesses of the late 1980s. The growth rate of GNP was planned to average 6% per annum, and government investment to be drawn away from national construction programs towards agriculture, transportation and communications.

However, the national economy also showed similar signs of stagnation.  Although eighteen months of austerity measures had lowered inflation to 2.1%, after eighteen months of rising unemployment, stagnation of industrial output and a breakdown of the Chinese financial system because of debt defaults, the government was forced to loosen the economic screws in the mid-1990s.

Increased investment into capital construction programs and Township and Village Enterprises (TVEs) was the government's solution to reviving the economy. However, by mid-1991 signs re-emerged that the economy was about to overheat once again. Rises in industrial production within TVEs of 32% for the first half of 1991, refusal to heed calls for curbs on investment capital construction in the provinces as well as the re-emergence of double-digit inflation. The rapid growth of early 1991 indicated that the government was still going to have to struggle further with enforcing its economic policies.

The national economy had been characterised by a large share of industry—standing at 61.2% of total GDP in 1990—with a smaller share of 24.4% devoted to agriculture and a much smaller service sector constituting only 14.4% of GDP. Such a constitution of GDP was a reflection of the Soviet influence of a planned economy since the 1950s. The dominance of the industrial sector in the PRC's GDP constitution has not always been the case however, and it has been largely through governmental intervention that this evolution took place.

In 2004, of the industrial added value created by all state-owned industrial enterprises and non-state industrial enterprises with annual turnover exceeding five million yuan, state-owned and state stock-holding enterprises accounted for 42.4 percent, collectively owned enterprises 5.3 percent, the rest taken up by other non-public enterprises, including enterprises with investment from outside mainland China, and individual and private enterprises. The result is a dynamic juxtaposition of diversified economic elements.

In 2004, of Chinese enterprises ranking in the world's top 500, 14 enterprises of China's mainland were all state-owned. Of China's own top 500, 74 percent (370) were state-owned and state stock-holding enterprises, with assets of 27, 370 billion yuan and realizing profit of 266.3 billion yuan, representing 96.96 percent and 84.09 percent respectively of the top 500 corresponding values. Small and medium-sized enterprises and non-public enterprises have become China's main job creators. Private enterprises alone provided 50 percent of employment of the entire society.

Industrial output
China has achieved a rapid increase in the gross value of industrial output (used before China switched to GNP accounting in 1986), which, according to official Chinese statistics, rose by 13.3% annually between 1950 and 1979. The greatest sustained surge in growth occurred during the first decade, with the rate averaging 22% annually during 1949–60. During 1961–74, the yearly growth rate fell to about 6%, partly as a result of the disruptions brought on by the collapse of the Great Leap Forward (which accompanied the withdrawal of Soviet technicians in mid-1960) and of work stoppages and transportation disruptions during the Cultural Revolution. Growth averaged 10% from 1970 to 1980 and 10.1% from 1979 to 1985. Major policy reforms of 1984 further accelerated the pace of industrial growth, which reached 20.8% by 1988. After a brief retrenchment period in 1989–90 as government policies prioritized inflation control over other concerns, expansion of the country's industrial sector resumed apace, exceeding 20% in 1992 and 18% in 1994. Industrial output was officially up 13.4% in 1995, with state enterprises contributing the majority.

While approximately 50% of total industrial output still derives from the state-owned factories, a notable feature of China's recent industrial history has been the dynamic growth of the collectively owned rural township and village enterprise as well as private and foreign joint-venture sectors. Also apparent has been the spatial unevenness of recent industrial development, with growth concentrated mainly in Shanghai, the traditional hub of China's industrial activity, and, increasingly, a number of new economic centers along the southern coast. The coastal provinces of Jiangsu, Guangdong, Shandong, Shanghai and Zhejiang provinces together account for close to 33% of the country's total industrial output and most of its merchandise exports. One key factor in this industrial geography has been the government's establishment of several Special Economic Zones in Guangdong, Fujian and Hainan provinces, and its designation of over 14 "open coastal cities" where foreign investment in export-oriented industries was actively encouraged during the 1980s.

China's cotton textile industry is the largest in the world, producing yarn, cloth, woolen piece goods, knitting wool, silk, jute bags, and synthetic fibers. Labor-intensive light industries played a prominent role in the industrial boom of the late 1980s and early 1990s, accounting for 49% of total industrial output, but heavy industry and high technology took over in the late 1990s. In addition to garments and textiles, output from light industry includes footwear, toys, food processing, and consumer electronics. Heavy industries include iron and steel, coal, machine building, armaments, petroleum, cement, chemical fertilizers, and autos. High technology industries produce high-speed computers, 600 types of semiconductors, specialized electronic measuring instruments, and telecommunications equipment.

Since 1962, industry has been providing agriculture with farm machines, chemical fertilizers, insecticides, means of transportation, power, building materials, and other essential commodities. Handicraft cooperatives also have been busy making hand-operated or animal-drawn implements. Production of a variety of industrial goods has expanded, increasingly in order to supply the country's own expanding industrial base. In addition to fertilizers, the chemicals industry produces calcium carbide, ethylene, and plastics. Since 1963, great emphasis has been placed on the manufacture of transportation equipment, and China now produces varied lines of passenger cars, trucks, buses, and bicycles. In 1995, output included 1,452,697 motor vehicles (more than double the 1991 figure). Output for 2009 was over 13.7 million units. The industry underwent a major overhaul in the late 1990s in order to stimulate efficiency and production. Large numbers of joint ventures with foreign firms helped introduce new technology and management to the industry.

Machinery manufacturing
China's machinery manufacturing industry can provide complete sets of large advanced equipment, including large gas turbines, large pump storage groups, and nuclear power sets, ultra-high voltage direct-current transmission and transformer equipment, complete sets of large metallurgical, fertilizer and petro-chemical equipment, urban light rail transport equipment, and new papermaking and textile machinery. Machinery and transportation equipment have i  been the mainstay products of Chinese exports, as China's leading export sector for successive 11 years from 1996 to 2006. In 2006, the export value of machinery and transportation equipment reached 425 billion US dollars, 28.3 percent more than 2005.

Energy industry

Thermal, hydro and nuclear power industries are the fastest growing of all industrial sectors. At the end of 2009, the installed capacity of generators totaled 874 million kW, and the total generated electricity came to 3.2 trillion kwh, ranking second in the world.

Power grid construction has entered its fastest ever development; main power grids now cover all the cities and most rural areas,  with 501-kv grids beginning to replace 220-kv grids for inter-province and inter-region transmission and exchange operations. An international advanced control automation system with computers as the mainstay has been universally adopted, and has proved practical. Now China's power industry has entered a new era featuring large generating units, large power plants, large power grids, ultra-high voltage and automation.

Starting in the 1980s, China has invested hugely into creating a number of large-scale modern coal mines, contributing to the gradual increase of coal output, maintained at more than one billion tons annually since 1989. China now has the ability to design, construct, equip, and administer 10-million-ton opencast coalmines and large and medium-sized mining areas. China's coal washing and dressing technologies and abilities have constantly improved and coal liquefaction and underground gasification are being introduced.

Petroleum and natural gas are important energy resources. For eight years running from 1997 to 2004, annual crude oil output exceeded 160 million tons, ranking fifth in the world. Oil industry development has accelerated the growth of local economies and related industries, such as machinery manufacturing, iron and steel industries, transport and communications. In 1996, China's natural gas output surpassed 20 billion cu m, a figure that has increased steadily over the following years, reaching 41.49 billion cu m in 2004.

In 2004, China's nuclear-power-generated electricity topped 50 billion kwh, setting a record high, By 2020, China will build 36-million-kW nuclear power facilities, in addition to the 8.7-million-kW nuclear power generation capacity already in use and under construction.

To relieve the shortage of energy supplies that fetters China's economic growth, China is developing new energy resources, such as wind, solar, geothermal, and tidal power. Its abundant wind energy resources give China the potential for mass-produced wind power. Between 2001 and 2005, the government invested 1.5 billion yuan in the wind power industry. Some 200,000 small wind turbines already play an important power generation role in agricultural and pastoral areas and according to government targets the national installed capacity of wind generators is to increase greatly. It is expected to add 18GW to the installed base of 20 GW by 2010. Given northern China's rich wind energy resources, its wind power industry has attracted domestic and overseas investment and Asia's largest wind power station, with an investment of 10 billion yuan and a capacity of one million kW, will be completed in Inner Mongolia before 2008. Meanwhile, in western China, with a radiation flux of three thousand kwh per day, solar energy has been widely utilized. Asia's largest demonstration base for solar heating and cooling technologies in Yuzhong County, Gansu Province, has become the training center of applied solar technologies for developing countries.

Automobile

An example of an emerging heavy industry is automobile manufacture, which has soared during the reform period. In 1975 only 139,800 automobiles were produced annually, but by 1985 production had reached 443,377, then jumped to nearly 1.1 million by 1992 and increased fairly evenly each year up until 2001, when it reached 2.3 million. In 2002 production rose to nearly 3.3 million and then jumped again the next year to 4.4 million. Domestic sales have kept pace with production. After respectable annual increases in the mid- and late 1990s, sales soared in 18 the early 2000s, reaching 3 million automobiles sold in 2003. With some governmental controls in place, sales dipped to 2.4 million sold in 2004.

Sales automobiles and vans reached 13 million in 2010.  So successful has China's automotive industry been that it began exporting car parts in 1999. China began to plan major moves into the automobile and components export business starting in 2005. A new Honda factory in Guangzhou was being built in 2004 solely for the export market and was expected to ship 30,000 passenger vehicles to Europe in 2005. By 2004, 12 major foreign automotive manufacturers had joint-venture plants in China. They produced a wide range of automobiles, minivans, sport utility vehicles, buses, and trucks. In 2003 China exported US$4.7 billion worth of vehicles and components, an increase of 34.4 percent over 2002. By 2004 China had become the world's fourth largest automotive vehicle manufacturer.

Steel

Concomitant with automotive production and other steel-consuming industries, China has been rapidly increasing its steel production. Iron ore production kept pace with steel production in the early 1990s but was soon outpaced by imported iron ore and other metals in the early 2000s. Steel production, an estimated 140 million tons in 2000, rose to more than 420 million tons by 2007.

Before the first five-year plan (1953–57), China had only one major steel center— Anshan, in the northeast—and several minor ones. All these produced 1.93 million tons of pig iron and 1.35 million tons of steel in 1952. By 1995, China was producing 92,970 million tons of crude steel and 101,700 million tons of pig iron. China had one trillion tons of confirmed coal reserves and an estimated five trillion tons of coal reserves and 48.7 billion tons of iron ore in 2000. Anshan continues to be the hub of the industry, but other huge steel complexes have been constructed at Baotou, Benxi (about 50 km east of Anshan), Taiyuan, Wuhan, and Ma'anshan (near Nanjing).

See also
 Category:Industry in China
 Category:Motor vehicle manufacturers of China
 Pollution in China
 Environmental issues in China

References

External links
 China Macroeconomic and Industrial Data
 China Industry Association Network
 China Enterprise Confederation & China Enterprise Directors Association
 Chinese Industry & Commerce An Annotated Directory of Internet Resources
 China Information Industry Net
 China Business Information Center
 Industries Driving China's Economy – Investopedia